The Laws of Scourge is the second studio album by the Brazilian extreme metal band Sarcófago. It was on this album that the band's lyrical content shifted from Satanism to more realistic subject matter; "Midnight Queen" is about a prostitute, while "Screeches From The Silence" is about living life in a care-free manner. After the lo-fi black/thrash metal style of I.N.R.I., The Laws of Scourge marks a change in musical style, with the band playing clearer and more proficient death/thrash metal. This was also the last full-length record to feature a human drummer, as from Hate onwards, the band would use a drum machine.

Track listing

Credits

Sarcófago
Wagner Lamounier - lead vocals, rhythm guitar
Fábio Jhasko - lead guitar
Gerald Minelli - backing vocals, acoustic guitar, bass guitar
Lucio Oliver - drums, percussion

Additional Musicians
Eugênio "Dead Zone" - keyboards 
Claudio David - backing vocals (on "Midnight Queen", "Screeches From The Silence" and "Crush, Kill, Destroy")

Production
Arranged and produced by Sarcofago
Recorded and mixed by Gauguin and Sarcofago

References

Sarcófago albums
1991 albums